Tucker DeVries (born December 7, 2002) is an American college basketball player for the Drake Bulldogs of the Missouri Valley Conference (MVC).

Early life and high school career
DeVries grew up in Omaha, Nebraska and initially attended Elkhorn High School. After his freshman year he moved with his family to Waukee, Iowa and enrolled at Waukee High School after his father, Darian DeVries, was hired as the head men's basketball coach at Drake University. He played alongside future Iowa commit Payton Sandfort. As a senior, DeVries was named Iowa Mr. Basketball after he averaged 18.5 points, 6.6 rebounds, 5.6 assists, and 2.9 steals per game. He was rated a four-star recruit and the best overall recruit from his class in the state of Iowa. DeVries committed to playing for his father at Drake over offers from Iowa State, Oregon, and Creighton.

College career
DeVries became a starter at small forward for the Drake Bulldogs early in his freshman season. He finished his freshman season averaging 13.9 points, 4.6 rebounds, and 2.1 assists per game and was named the Missouri Valley Conference (MVC) Freshman of the Year and second team all-conference. DeVries was named the preseason MVC Player of the Year entering his sophomore season.

At the conclusion of the 2022–23 season, DeVries was named MVC Player of the Year. He was named the Most Valuable Player of the 2023 Missouri Valley Conference men's basketball tournament after scoring 22 points in the final against Bradley.

Career statistics

College

|-
| style="text-align:left;"| 2021–22
| style="text-align:left;"| Drake
| 36 || 29 || 29.8 || .416 || .339 || .775 || 4.6 || 2.1 || 1.0 || .8 || 13.9

Personal life
DeVries father, Darian, played college basketball at Northern Iowa and was an assistant coach at Creighton for 18 years before becoming the head coach at Drake. His uncle, Jared, was an All-American defensive end at Iowa and played in the NFL for the Detroit Lions.

References

External links
Drake Bulldogs bio

2002 births
Living people
American men's basketball players
Basketball players from Nebraska
Drake Bulldogs men's basketball players
Shooting guards
Small forwards
Sportspeople from Omaha, Nebraska